Kalonymos or Kalonymus ( Qālōnīmūs) is a prominent Jewish family who lived in Italy, mostly in Lucca and in Rome, which, after the settlement at Mainz and Speyer of several of its members, took during many generations a leading part in the development of Jewish learning in Germany. The family is according to many  considered the foundation of Hachmei Provence and the Ashkenazi Hasidim.

Name
The name should technically be spelled "Kalonymos," as Kalonymus ben Kalonymus and Immanuel the Roman both rhyme it with words ending in "-mos". The name, which occurs in Greece, Italy, and Provence, is of Greek origin; Kalonymos means "good name" and Wolf pointed that it is a translation of the Hebrew "Shem-Tov"; Zunz, that it represented the Latin "Cleonymus".

Early history
Traces of the family in Italy may be found as early as the second half of the eighth century. As to the date of the settlement of its members in Germany, the opinions of modern scholars are divided, owing to the conflicting statements of the Jewish sources.

Rapoport, Leopold Zunz, and many others place the settlement in 876, believing the King Charles, mentioned in the sources as having induced the Kalonymides to emigrate to Germany, to have been Charles the Bald, who was in Italy in that year; Luzzatto and others think that it took place under Charlemagne, in approximately 800 CE, alleging that the desire to attract scholars to the empire was more in keeping with the character of that monarch; still others assign it to the reign of Otto II, Holy Roman Emperor (973-983), whose life, according to the historian Thietmar von Merseburg, was saved in a battle with the Saracens by a Jew named Kalonymus. The following table, compiled from the accounts of Eleazar of Worms and Solomon Luria, gives the Italian and German heads of the family, which produced for nearly five centuries the most notable scholars of Germany and northern France, such as Samuel he-Hasid and his son Judah he-Hasid. Although all of them are mentioned as having been important scholars, the nature of the activity of only a few of them is known.

Family members to 1080

 

|- 
|style="text-align: left;"|Notes:

(after the Jewish Encyclopedia, 1906)

Ithiel I.
It was translated into German by Zunz.

Moses I. (ben Meshullam)
Liturgical poet; lived at Rome or at Lucca about 850.

Kalonymus II. (ben Moses)
Halakhist and liturgical poet; flourished at Lucca or at Rome about 950. He was consulted on ritual questions by Rabbenu Gershom; and twelve responsa of his are included in the collection compiled by Joseph ben Samuel Tob Alam and published by D. Cassel under the title "Teshubot Geonim Kadmonim" (Nos. 106-118). Rabbenu Gershom remarks that there exists in rabbinical literature a confusion concerning the identity of Kalonymus and his son Meshullam the Great, and the saying of one is sometimes attributed to the other. Thus Rashi quotes three emendations in the Talmudical text in the name of R. Meshullam, while Rabbeinu Tam gives them in the name of R. Kalonymus. Kalonymus was the author of a kerovah for feast-days. To him probably belong the rehitim  which bear the signature "Kalonymus" or "Kalonymus the Elder." Eleazer of Worms attributes also to him the piyyut .

Meshullam the Great
Meshullam the Great, called also the Roman, was a halakhist and liturgical poet; flourished at Rome or at Lucca about 976. He carried on with Rabbeinu Gershom and Simon the Great a scientific correspondence, which is included in the "Teshuvot Geonim Kadmonim" (13a), and was the author of a commentary on Avot Meshullam engaged in polemics with the Karaites. From the Bible text he demonstrates that, contrary to their opinion, one may quit one's house on Shabbat and have one's house lighted on the night of Shabbat.

Meshullam was a prolific liturgical poet. Of the piyyutim contained in the kerovah of the "Shacharit" service of the Day of Atonement, at least twenty (possibly thirty-two) belong to him. He wrote also: an "'Avodah," recited after the prayer for the synagogue reader and containing a cursory review of Biblical history from Adam down to Levi; a yoẓer for Passover; and two zulot. Altogether thirty-eight piyyuṭim are attributed to him. Although their language is labored, they are distinguished by their elevation of thought and conciseness. There was another payyeṭan called "Meshullam the Great," to whom probably belongs the Aramaic poetical Targum on the Decalogue which is generally attributed to Meshullam the Great ben Kalonymus.

Kalonymus III. (ben Meshullam)
Kalonymus ben Meshullam, Liturgical poet; flourished at Mainz about 1000. He figures in the Amnon legend as having written the Unetanneh Tokef, which had been revealed to him in a dream by the martyr Amnon of Mainz.

Hananeel I. ben Kalonymus
Liturgical poet; flourished at Mainz or Speyer in the eleventh century; brother of Moses III.

Moses ben Kalonymus
Liturgical poet; flourished at Mainz in 1020. Citations from several of the ḳerovah poems are given in various earlier Bible commentaries. (On the confusion existing in the rabbinical sources concerning the identity of the author of the ל, see Zunz)

Yekuthiel ben Moses
Liturgical poet; flourished at Speyer in 1070. He was the author of the reshut  to Kalir's kerovah for Rosh Hashanah. A son of Yekuthiel named Moses of Speyer is quoted as a high Talmudical authority.

Meshullam ben Moses
Liturgical poet; lived at Mainz in 1080. He was the author of the following five piyyutim. Meshullam was among those who killed themselves May 27, 1096, in order not to fall into the hands of the Crusaders.

Kalonymus ben Isaac the Elder

German halachist; lived at Speyer in the eleventh and twelfth centuries; father of Samuel he-Hasid, grandfather of Judah he-Hasid, and great-grandfather of Judah ben Kalonymus, as the following pedigree shows:

|- 
|style="text-align: left;"|Notes:

He was the grandson of Eliezer ben Isaac ha-Gadol.

Kalonymus is quoted in the Tosafot (Hullin 47b), and a responsum of his is included in the collection of responsa of Meir of Rothenburg (No. 501). From the account of Kalonymus given in the "Mordechai" (Pesachim, end), in the "Pardes" (§§ 75, 88, 245, 290), and in the "Mazref la-Hokmah" (p. 14a), it may be inferred that he was rabbi in Mainz, and that during the First Crusade (1096) he was compelled to flee to Speyer. He died in December, 1127. His body could not be buried because of the investment of the city by Lothar, the burial-ground being outside of the place. At a later time it was interred at Mainz.

Kalonymus ben Judah

Kalonymus ben Judah or Kalonymus the Elder lived in Mainz at the beginning of the twelfth century. He was a contemporary of Eliakim ben Joseph, the teacher of Eleazar ben Nathan (RaBaN).

Kalonymus ben Judah or Kalonymus the Younger

Liturgical poet; flourished at Speyer (?) about 1160; probably a grandson of Kalonymus ben Isaac the Elder. He was a contemporary of Isaac ben Shalom, grandfather of Isaac Or Zarua, and was the author of many liturgical poems in various styles, e.g., ofan, zulat, and reshut, and especially of seliḥot. Thirty of his poetical productions have been incorporated in the Maḥzor. Among his selichot the most noteworthy are the Seder of Pesach, in which the author describes the readiness shown by the Jews, in the persecutions of the Crusades, to die for the faith of their fathers; the kinah , on the sufferings of the Jews during the persecutions of 1147 ("Monatsschrift," xx. 257); and ראשי מים, on the fate of the Jews from the times of the Pharaohs to the destruction of the Temple by Titus. The whole of the first selicha and the end of the second have been translated into German by Leopold Zunz.

More members

More members of the Kalonymus family, who have pages for themselves.

 Kalonymus ben Kalonymus
 David Kalonymus ben Jacob
 Isaac Nathan ben Kalonymus
 Kalonymus ben Todros
 Eleazar ben Judah ben Kalonymus
Judah ben Kalonymus

Bibliography

Source

 Rapoport, in Bikkure ha-'Ittim, x. 40 et seq., 111 et seq.; xi. 100;
 Carmoly, in Jost's Annalen, i. 222;
 Luzzatto, Giudaismo Illustrato, p. 30;
 Zunz, G. V. Index;
 idem, Literaturgesch. Index;
 idem, Z. G. Index;
 Monatsschrift, 1854, pp. 236 et seq.; 1878, pp. 250 et seq.;
 Grätz, Gesch. v. 193;
 Güdemann, Gesch. i. 11 et seq.;
 Giesebrecht, Kaiserzeit, i. 849;
 Bresslau, in Zeitschrift für die Gesch. der Juden in Deutschland, i. 156 et seq.;
 Aronius, ib. ii. 82 et seq.;
 Vogelstein and Rieger, Gesch. der Juden in Rom, i. 139.G. I. Br.

Italian rabbis
Jewish-Italian families